This article summarizes the highlights of professional and amateur golf in the year 2014.

Men's professional golf
Major championships
10–13 April: Masters Tournament – Bubba Watson won by three strokes to claim his second Masters championship.
12–15 June: U.S. Open – Martin Kaymer won by eight strokes, becoming the first German player to win the U.S. Open, and the first player to win the Players Championship and the U.S. Open in the same year. This was his second major victory. 
17–20 July: The Open Championship – Rory McIlroy won by two strokes over Rickie Fowler and Sergio García. It was his third career major championship, and his first Open Championship. With the win, he became the fourth player ever of 25 years old or under to have won at least three majors.
7–10 August: PGA Championship – Rory McIlroy won by one stroke over Phil Mickelson. It was his fourth career major and his second PGA Championship. It was also his third win in three starts, dating back to the Open Championship three weeks earlier.

World Golf Championships 
19–23 February: WGC-Accenture Match Play Championship – Australian Jason Day won his first WGC event, beating Victor Dubuisson of France on the 23rd hole.
6–9 March WGC-Cadillac Championship – Patrick Reed won his first WGC event, winning by one stroke. At age 23, he was the youngest ever winner of a WGC event.
31 July – 3 August: WGC-Bridgestone Invitational – Rory McIlroy won, finishing two stokes ahead of Sergio García. It was his first WGC victory, and his  first win on American soil in nearly two years.
6–9 November: WGC-HSBC Champions – Bubba Watson won, defeating Tim Clark on the first playoff hole. It was his first WGC victory, and his first victory outside of the United States.

FedEx Cup playoff events - see 2014 FedEx Cup Playoffs
21–24 August: The Barclays – Hunter Mahan won by two strokes over Stuart Appleby, Jason Day, and Cameron Tringale. The win vaulted him from 62nd to 1st in the FedEx Cup standings.
29 August – 1 September: Deutsche Bank Championship – Chris Kirk won by two shots over Russell Henley, Billy Horschel, and Geoff Ogilvy.
4–7 September: BMW Championship – Billy Horschel won by two strokes over Bubba Watson.
11–14 September: Tour Championship – Billy Horschel won by three strokes over Jim Furyk and Rory McIlroy. His second consecutive playoff win also earned him the FedEx Cup.

Other leading PGA Tour events 
8–11 May: The Players Championship – German Martin Kaymer won, finishing one stroke ahead of Jim Furyk.

For a complete list of PGA Tour results see 2014 PGA Tour.

Leading European Tour events 
22–25 May: BMW PGA Championship – Northern Irishman Rory McIlroy birdied the 18th hole, and won by one stroke over Irishman Shane Lowry, who also birdied the 18th hole.
15–19 October: Volvo World Match Play Championship – Finn Mikko Ilonen defeated Swede Henrik Stenson 3 & 1 in the championship match.
30 October – 2 November: BMW Masters – Marcel Siem won in a playoff with Ross Fisher and Alexander Lévy.
13–16 November: Turkish Airlines Open – Brooks Koepka won from the clubhouse by one stroke over Ian Poulter, who failed to make birdie at the par-5 18th hole. It was Koepka's first career European Tour victory.
20–23 November: DP World Tour Championship, Dubai – Henrik Stenson won by 2 strokes over Victor Dubuisson, Rory McIlroy, and Justin Rose. It was his second straight DP World Tour Championship victory.

For a complete list of European Tour results see 2014 European Tour.

Team events
28–30 March: EurAsia Cup – The first EurAsia Cup ended in a 10–10 tie with the European and Asian teams sharing the Cup.
26–28 September: Ryder Cup – Team Europe defeated Team USA by a score of 16½ – 11½. It was the third consecutive Ryder Cup victory for Europe, and also Europe's fifth consecutive home victory in the Ryder Cup.

Tour leaders
PGA Tour –  Rory McIlroy (US$8,280,096)
 This total does not include FedEx Cup bonuses.
European Tour –  Rory McIlroy (7,149,503 points)
This total includes the US$1.25 million (€1.0 million) bonus for winning the Race to Dubai.
Japan Golf Tour –  Koumei Oda (¥137,318,693)
Asian Tour –  David Lipsky (US$713,901)
PGA Tour of Australasia –  Greg Chalmers (A$254,525)
Sunshine Tour –  Thomas Aiken (R4,057,642)

Awards
PGA Tour
FedEx Cup –  Billy Horschel won the FedEx Cup after winning the final two playoff events, the BMW Championship and Tour Championship.
PGA Player of the Year –  Rory McIlroy
Player of the Year (Jack Nicklaus Trophy) –  Rory McIlroy
Leading money winner (Arnold Palmer Award) –  Rory McIlroy (US$8,280,096)
Vardon Trophy –  Rory McIlroy
Byron Nelson Award –  Rory McIlroy
Rookie of the Year –  Chesson Hadley
Payne Stewart Award –  Nick Faldo
European Tour
Golfer of the Year –  Rory McIlroy
Rookie of the Year –  Brooks Koepka
Web.com Tour
Player of the Year –  Carlos Ortiz

Results from other tours
2014 Asian Tour
2014 PGA Tour of Australasia
2014 Challenge Tour
2014 Japan Golf Tour
2014 OneAsia Tour
2014 PGA Tour Canada
2014 PGA Tour China
2014 PGA Tour Latinoamérica
2014 Sunshine Tour
2014 Web.com Tour

Other happenings
11 May: Ian MacGregor, caddie for Alastair Forsyth, died of an apparent heart attack during the final round of the Madeira Islands Open - Portugal - BPI, a tournament dual-sanctioned by the European Tour and the Challenge Tour.
18 May: For the second time, Miguel Ángel Jiménez extended his own record as the oldest golfer to win on the European Tour, winning the Open de España at age .
18 May: Adam Scott became the world's number one golfer.
4 August: Rory McIlroy regained the world number one position, last held in March 2013.

Women's professional golf
LPGA majors
3–6 April: Kraft Nabisco Championship – Lexi Thompson won by three strokes over Michelle Wie; it was her first career major win, and her fourth career LPGA Tour win.  
19–22 June: U.S. Women's Open – Michelle Wie won by two strokes over Stacy Lewis; it was her first career major win, and her fourth career LPGA Tour win. It was also her first win on the U.S. mainland (her previous LPGA Tour wins had occurred in Mexico, Canada, and her home state of Hawaii).
10–13 July: Ricoh Women's British Open – Mo Martin won by one stroke over Shanshan Feng and Suzann Pettersen. It was her first major win, and also her first LPGA Tour win.
14–17 August: Wegmans LPGA Championship – Inbee Park successfully defended her LPGA Championship title, defeating Brittany Lincicome on the first hole of a playoff. It was her second LPGA Championship, and her fifth major title overall.
11–14 September: The Evian Championship – Kim Hyo-joo won by one stroke over Karrie Webb, with Kim making birdie and Webb making bogey at the 72nd hole. It was Kim's first LPGA Tour victory.

Additional LPGA Tour events 
20–23 November: CME Group Tour Championship – Lydia Ko won in a playoff over Julieta Granada and Carlota Ciganda. It was her eighth professional victory, and fifth LPGA Tour victory. Her performance also secured her the $1,000,000 bonus for winning the Race to the CME Globe.

For a complete list of LPGA Tour results, see 2014 LPGA Tour.
For a complete list of Ladies European Tour results see 2014 Ladies European Tour.

Team events 
24–27 July: International Crown – Spain swept all four of its singles matches and won with 15 points, four points better than Sweden.

Money list leaders
LPGA Tour –  Stacy Lewis (US$2,539,039)
LPGA of Japan Tour –  Ahn Sun-ju (￥153,075,741)
Ladies European Tour –  Charley Hull (€263,097)
LPGA of Korea Tour –  Kim Hyo-joo (₩1,208,978,590)
Ladies Asian Golf Tour –  Pornanong Phatlum (US$82,500)
ALPG Tour –   Karrie Webb (A$199,242) (2013/14 season)
Symetra Tour –  Marissa Steen (US$75,348)

Awards
 LPGA:
 Race to the CME Globe –  Lydia Ko
 Player of the Year –  Stacy Lewis
 Rookie of the Year –  Lydia Ko
 Vare Trophy –  Stacy Lewis
 LET:
 Player of the Year –
 Rookie of the Year –  Amy Boulden
 LPGA of Japan Tour Player of the Year –  Ahn Sun-ju

Other tour results
2014 Symetra Tour
2014 Ladies Asian Golf Tour
2014 LPGA of Korea Tour

Other happenings
8 January – The LPGA announced a renamed CME Group Tour Championship and season-long points race, the "Race to the CME Globe". The winner of the Race will receive a $1 million bonus. The Race is similar to the PGA Tour's FedEx Cup and the European Tour's Race to Dubai.
29 May – The LPGA announced that the LPGA Championship will become the "KPMG Women's PGA Championship" in 2015 and be  conducted by the PGA of America.
 11 September – On her way to the Evian Championship title, Kim Hyo-joo shot 61 in the first round, the lowest round ever in a major championship for either sex.
 12 October - With her win at Hite Jinro Championship, Kim Hyo-joo became the first LPGA of Korea Tour player to earn more than 1 billion KRW during one season.
 18 November – The LPGA announces that the first major of its season will be renamed from the Kraft Nabisco Championship to the ANA Inspiration effective with the 2015 edition. The new title sponsor is All Nippon Airways, replacing the former Kraft Foods (now Mondelēz International) and its Nabisco subsidiary, which had sponsored the tournament since 1982.

Senior men's professional golf
Senior majors
15–18 May: Regions Tradition - Kenny Perry won his third Champions Tour major and his first Regions Tradition, winning by one stroke over Mark Calcavecchia. Perry became the first golfer to win three consecutive Champions Tour major starts since Gary Player in 1987–88 (in 2013, Perry won the Senior Players Championship and U.S. Senior Open before skipping The Senior Open Championship).
22–25 May: Senior PGA Championship – Colin Montgomerie won his first major of any kind, finishing four strokes ahead of Tom Watson. It is his first win on U.S. soil.
26–29 June: Constellation Senior Players Championship - German Bernhard Langer won his first Senior Players Championship and his third career senior major, by defeating Jeff Sluman in a playoff. It was also his 21st career Champions Tour victory, as well as his 92nd career professional victory.
10–13 July: U.S. Senior Open – Colin Montgomerie won his second major of the 2014 season, defeating Gene Sauers in a 3-hole aggregate playoff.
24–27 July: The Senior Open Championship – German Bernhard Langer won his second major of the year by a record 13 strokes over Colin Montgomerie.

Full results
2014 Champions Tour
2014 European Senior Tour

Money list leaders
Champions Tour – German Bernhard Langer topped the money list for the sixth time (third consecutive) with earnings of US$3,074,189. This surpassed Hale Irwin's 2002 record for single-season winnings. 
European Senior Tour – Colin Montgomerie topped the Order of Merit with earnings of €624,543.

Awards
Champions Tour
Charles Schwab Cup –  Bernhard Langer
Player of the Year –  Bernhard Langer
Rookie of the Year –  Scott Dunlap
Leading money winner (Arnold Palmer Award) –  Bernhard Langer
Lowest stroke average (Byron Nelson Award) –  Bernhard Langer

Other happenings
16 August: Kevin Sutherland, at the second round of the Dick's Sporting Goods Open, became the first person on the Champions Tour to shoot a 59, going −13 on the par-72 course.

Amateur golf
20–23 May: NCAA Division I Women's Golf Championships – Duke won its sixth team title and Doris Chen of Southern California claimed the individual title.
23–28 May: NCAA Division I Men's Golf Championships – Alabama won its second consecutive team title, and Cameron Wilson of Stanford claimed the individual title.
6–8 June: Curtis Cup – The United States defeated Great Britain and Ireland by a score of 13–7, giving the United States team five consecutive home victories in the competition.
16–21 June: The Amateur Championship – Bradley Neil of Scotland defeated Zander Lombard of South Africa in the final match by a score of 2 & 1.
24–28 June: British Ladies Amateur – Emily Kristine Pedersen of Denmark defeated Leslie Cloots of Belgium in the final match by a score of 3 & 1. 
4–10 August: U.S. Women's Amateur – American Kristen Gillman defeated Canada's Brooke Henderson, 2 up, in the final.
11–17 August: U.S. Amateur – South Korean Gunn Yang defeated Canada's Corey Conners in the final match by a score of 2 & 1.
3–6 September Espirito Santo Trophy – Australia beat Canada by two strokes to claim its third trophy.
10–13 September Eisenhower Trophy – The United States won by two strokes over Canada, their 15th win in 29 playings.
21–26 October: Asia-Pacific Amateur Championship – Australian Antonio Murdaca won by seven strokes.

Other happenings
 22 January – Augusta National Golf Club, The R&A, and the USGA jointly announced the creation of a new major men's amateur tournament, the Latin America Amateur Championship. The tournament, set to hold its first edition in January 2015, will be open to amateurs from Mexico, the Caribbean, Central America, and South America. The winner will receive invitations to the Masters, The Amateur Championship, the U.S. Amateur, and any other USGA event for which he is eligible apart from the U.S. Open. In addition, the winner and runner-up will receive automatic entry to final qualifying for the U.S. Open and The Open Championship.

World Golf Hall of Fame inductees
Changes to the induction process were announced in March 2014. The following individuals were announced as new inductees on 15 October 2014, with induction occurring on 13 July 2015 in conjunction with the 2015 Open Championship at St Andrews:
  Laura Davies (Female Competitor)
  David Graham (Male Competitor)
  Mark O'Meara (Male Competitor)
  A. W. Tillinghast (Lifetime Achievement)

Deaths
30 January – Danielle Downey (born 1980), LPGA and Futures Tour player
21 March – Jack Fleck (born 1921), PGA Tour player, best known for defeating Ben Hogan in a playoff at the 1955 U.S. Open
12 April – Beverly Hanson (born 1924), three-time LPGA Tour major winner
2 July – Errie Ball (born 1910), oldest living player from first Masters Tournament
22 August – Jack Harris (born 1922), life member of PGA Australia
12 September – Hugh Royer Jr. (born 1936), PGA Tour player. He won the 1970 Western Open
9 November – Rubén Alvarez (born 1961), European Tour player from Argentina
6 December – Fred Hawkins (born 1923), PGA Tour winner, runner-up at 1958 Masters Tournament
21 December – Tom Nieporte (born 1928), three-time PGA Tour winner

Table of results
This table summarizes all the results referred to above in date order.

The following biennial events will next be played in 2015: Solheim Cup, Walker Cup, Presidents Cup, Seve Trophy, World Cup.

References

 
2014